NGC 7074 is an edge-on lenticular galaxy located about 140 million light-years away in the constellation of Pegasus. NGC 7074 was discovered by astronomer Albert Marth on October 16, 1863.

See also 
 List of NGC objects (7001–7840)

References

External links 

Lenticular galaxies
Pegasus (constellation)
7074
66850
Astronomical objects discovered in 1863